Mecano: En Concierto is the fourth album recorded by Spanish synth-pop band Mecano in 1985. The album is the only live album the band recorded, and it only included the earlier work of the band. It was recorded live during the band's 1984-85 tour. This would be the last album under CBS records. The album would be released June 29, 1985. The only single release for this album was the live version of "Aire". Some of the tracks were taken from the 1984 concert in Segovia (Spain), which included Warren Cann from Ultravox and Hans Zimmer (on drums and keyboards, respectively).

Track listing
 "Japón (introducción) (Nacho Cano) 2:02"
 "Hoy no me puedo levantar (José María Cano / Nacho Cano) 3:20".
 " Quiero vivir en la ciudad (José María Cano / Nacho Cano) 2:43 ".
 "Aire (José María Cano) 4:58".
 "Me colé en una fiesta (Nacho Cano) 3:35".
 "Hawaii-Bombay (José María Cano) 3:40".
 "Ya viene el sol (introducción) (Nacho Cano) 1:01".
 "La estación (Nacho Cano) 3:32 ".
 "El amante de fuego (Nacho Cano) 4:06".
 "Barco a Venus (Nacho Cano) 4:25".
 "Maquillaje (Nacho Cano) 2:45 ".
 "Me voy de casa (Nacho Cano) 2:50".

 Singles
 "Aire en concierto" released June 29, 1985.

Mecano albums
1985 live albums